Nayabazar is a town in West Sikkim District of the Indian state of Sikkim.

Demographics

As of the 2011 Census of India, Rongli had 252 households with a total population of 1,235. Males made up 656 of this figure and females 579 while 136 individuals were under six years of age. In 2001 the population was 996.

References

Cities and towns in Gyalshing district